State Route 172 (SR 172) is a  state highway that runs southwest-to-northeast through portions of Madison, Elbert, and Hart counties in the northeastern part of the U.S. state of Georgia.

Route description
SR 172 begins at an intersection with SR 72, northeast of Colbert, in Madison County. It heads northeast to an intersection with SR 98, northwest of Comer. It continues to the northeast and crosses over the Broad River into Elbert County. In Bowman is an intersection with SR 17. Shortly afterward, SR 172 crosses into Hart County. It continues to the northeast until it meets its northern terminus, an intersection with US 29/SR 8/SR 77 in Hartwell.

Major intersections

See also

References

External links

 Georgia Roads (Routes 161 - 180)
 Georgia State Route 172 on State-Ends.com

172
Transportation in Madison County, Georgia
Transportation in Elbert County, Georgia
Transportation in Hart County, Georgia